The 2016 Premier Futsal season is the inaugural season of Premier Futsal. The season features six teams each playing four matches before culminating to the finals. The league started on 15 July 2016 and ended on 24 July 2016.

Squads 
The squad lists are below:

Bengaluru 

 Paul Scholes (Marquee)
 Elias (GK)
 Neto
 Maximiliano
 Nabil
 Anatoliy
 Zaib
 Anto Rushith S
 Jonathan Piers
 Abhishek R (GK)
 Sathya Kumar
 Sai Nikhil

Head coach: Juan Jose Bernal Cierre
Source:

Chennai 

 Falcão (Marquee)
 Espindola (GK)
 Romulo 
 Cirilo 
 Camilo 
 Manel Rion  
 Sean 
 Faraz Abdul Azzez   
 Yash 
 Younus Pasha
 Rohit Suresh (GK)
 S. Nannda
 Haroon

Head coach: Ney Pereira
Source:

Goa 

 Ronaldinho (Marquee) (replaced by Cafu).
 Cafu (Marquee)
 Bebe (GK)
 Vampeta
 Rafael
 Georgievsky
 Adonias
 Michael Silva
 Fredsan Marshall
 Caitano
 Vatsal (GK)
 Praveendran
 Mohammed Ahtesham Ali

Head coach: Octavio Gomes De Oliveira Junior
Source:

Kochi 

  Míchel Salgado (Marquee)
 Casalone (GK)
 Chaguinha
 Deives Moraes
 Gekabert
 Emil
 Muhammed Ameer
 Basil
 Yashwant Kumar (GK)
 Ansh
 Stalin Daniel 
 Anupam

Head coach: Segio Sapo
Source:

Kolkata 

 Hernán Crespo (Marquee)
 Cidao (GK)
 Pula
 Gabriel
 Vander Carioca
 Majdoub
 Dida
 Mohammed Islam
 Amit Pal (GK)
 Subrata Dey
 Pradeep Shaw
 Akshay Nair
 Mayur Shellar

Head coach: Christian Roldan
Source:

Mumbai 

 Ryan Giggs (Marquee)
 Luis Amado (GK)
 Adriano Foglia
 Angelott Caro
 Kevin Ramirez
 Federico Perez
 Pablo
 Emmanuel
 Jo Paul Bence (GK)
 Akshay Nair
 Shubham Mane
 Chanpreet
 Shimyu

Head coach: Felice Mastropierro
Source:

See also 
 2016 Premier Futsal season
 Premier Futsal

References 

2016